Insect Dreams: The Half Life of Gregor Samsa is a sequel to Franz Kafka's 1915 short-story The Metamorphosis, written in 2002 by Marc Estrin.

Plot introduction
Gregor Samsa, the protagonist of The Metamorphosis, is revealed to have survived his apparent death at the end of the original story and goes on to have additional travels and experiences in the early-twentieth century.

Plot summary

Rather than being thrown away like trash, Gregor Samsa was secretly sold to a Viennese sideshow by the Samsas' chambermaid. He then met various figures like Wittgenstein, Spengler and Albert Einstein and witnessed American Prohibition, the Scopes trial, was involved in Alice Paul's feminist movement, encountered the Ku Klux Klan, and conferred with U.S. President Franklin D. Roosevelt, and Robert Oppenheimer.

Allusions/references to actual history, geography and current science

The novel made allusions to post-World War I Vienna through the Manhattan Project in Los Alamos, New Mexico.

References 

2002 American novels
Adaptations of works by Franz Kafka